United States v. Microsoft Corporation, 253 F.3d 34 (D.C. Cir. 2001), was a landmark American antitrust law case at the United States Court of Appeals for the District of Columbia Circuit. The U.S. government accused Microsoft of illegally maintaining its monopoly position in the personal computer (PC) market, primarily through the legal and technical restrictions it put on the abilities of PC manufacturers (OEMs) and users to uninstall Internet Explorer and use other programs such as Netscape and Java.

At the initial trial, the United States District Court for the District of Columbia ruled that Microsoft's actions constituted unlawful monopolization under Section 2 of the Sherman Antitrust Act of 1890, but the U.S. Court of Appeals for the D.C. Circuit partially overturned that judgment. The two parties later reached a settlement in which Microsoft agreed to modify some of its business practices.

History
By 1984 Microsoft was one of the most successful software companies, with $55 million in 1983 sales. InfoWorld wrote:

The Federal Trade Commission began an inquiry in 1992 over whether Microsoft was abusing its monopoly in the PC operating system market. The commissioners deadlocked with a 2–2 vote in 1993 and closed the investigation, but the Department of Justice (DOJ), led by Janet Reno, opened its own investigation later that year, resulting in a settlement on July 15, 1994, in which Microsoft consented not to tie other Microsoft products to the sale of Windows but remained free to integrate additional features into the operating system. In the years that followed, Microsoft insisted that Internet Explorer (IE) was not a product but a feature that it was allowed to add to Windows, although the DOJ did not agree with this definition.

The government alleged that Microsoft had abused monopoly power on Intel-based personal computers in its handling of operating system and web browser integration. The central issue was whether Microsoft was allowed to bundle its IE web browser software with its Windows operating system. Bundling the two products was allegedly a key factor in Microsoft's victory in the browser wars of the late 1990s, as every Windows user had a copy of IE. It was further alleged that this restricted the market for competing web browsers (such as Netscape Navigator or Opera), since it typically took extra time to buy and install the competing browsers. Underlying these disputes were questions of whether Microsoft had manipulated its application programming interfaces to favor IE over third-party browsers. The government also questioned Microsoft's conduct in enforcing restrictive licensing agreements with original equipment manufacturers who were required to include that arrangement.

Microsoft argued that the merging of Windows and IE was the result of innovation and competition, that the two were now the same product and inextricably linked, and that consumers were receiving the benefits of IE for free. Opponents countered that IE was still a separate product that did not need to be tied to Windows, since a separate version of IE was available for Mac OS. They also asserted that IE was not really free because its development and marketing costs may have inflated the price of Windows.

District Court trial
The case was initially tried before Judge Thomas Penfield Jackson at the United States District Court for the District of Columbia. The suit began on May 18, 1998, with the Department of Justice joined by the Attorneys General of twenty U.S. states and the District of Columbia. The case organized by the Department of Justice was focused less on interoperability and more on predatory strategies and market barriers to entry, built upon the allegation that Microsoft forced computer makers to include its Internet browser as a part of the installation of Windows software. 

Bill Gates was called "evasive and nonresponsive" by a source present at his videotaped deposition. He argued over the definitions of words such as "compete", "concerned", "ask", and "we"; certain portions of the proceeding would later provoke laughter from the judge when an excerpted version was shown in court. Businessweek reported that "early rounds of his deposition show him offering obfuscatory answers and saying 'I don't recall' so many times that even the presiding judge had to chuckle. Many of Gates's denials and pleas of ignorance were directly refuted by prosecutors with snippets of e-mails Gates both sent and received." Intel Vice-president Steven McGeady, called as a witness, quoted Paul Maritz, a senior Microsoft vice president, as having stated an intention to "extinguish" and "smother" rival Netscape Communications Corporation and to "cut off Netscape's air supply" by giving away a clone of Netscape's flagship product for free.

A number of videotapes were submitted as evidence by Microsoft during the trial, including one that demonstrated that removing Internet Explorer from Microsoft Windows caused slowdowns and malfunctions in Windows. In the videotaped demonstration of what then-Microsoft vice president Jim Allchin stated to be a seamless segment filmed on one PC, the government noticed that some icons mysteriously disappeared and reappeared on the PC's desktop, suggesting that the effects might have been falsified. Allchin admitted that the blame for the tape problems lay with some of his staff. "They ended up filming it—grabbing the wrong screen shot", he said of the incident. Later, Allchin re-ran the demonstration and provided a new videotape, but in so doing Microsoft dropped the claim that Windows is slowed down when IE is removed. Mark Murray, a Microsoft spokesperson, berated the government attorneys for "nitpicking on issues like video production".Microsoft later submitted a second inaccurate videotape into evidence. The issue was how easy or difficult it was for America Online users to download and install Netscape Navigator onto a Windows PC. Microsoft's videotape showed the process as being quick and easy, resulting in the Netscape icon appearing on the user's desktop. The government produced its own videotape of the same process, revealing that Microsoft's videotape had conveniently removed a long and complex part of the procedure and that the Netscape icon was not placed on the desktop, requiring a user to search for it. Brad Chase, a Microsoft vice president, verified the government's tape and conceded that Microsoft's own tape was falsified.

When the judge suggested that Microsoft offer a version of Windows that did not include Internet Explorer, Microsoft responded that the company would offer manufacturers a choice: one version of Windows that was obsolete, or another that did not work properly. The judge asked, "It seemed absolutely clear to you that I entered an order that required that you distribute a product that would not work?" David Cole, a Microsoft vice president, replied, "In plain English, yes. We followed that order. It wasn't my place to consider the consequences of that."

Gates and his successor as CEO Steve Ballmer were so worried about the outcome of the case that they discussed leaving Microsoft "if they really screw the company that badly, really just split it up in a totally irrational way", Gates recalled. Microsoft defended itself in the public arena, arguing that its attempts to "innovate" were under attack by rival companies jealous of its success, and that government litigation was merely their pawn. A full-page ad appeared in The Washington Post and The New York Times on June 2, 1999, created by a think tank called The Independent Institute. The ad was presented as "An Open Letter to President Clinton from 240 Economists on Antitrust Protectionism." It said in part, "Consumers did not ask for these antitrust actions – rival business firms did. Consumers of high technology have enjoyed falling prices, expanding outputs, and a breathtaking array of new products and innovations. ... Increasingly, however, some firms have sought to handicap their rivals by turning to government for protection. Many of these cases are based on speculation about some vaguely specified consumer harm in some unspecified future, and many of the proposed interventions will weaken successful U.S. firms and impede their competitiveness abroad."

Judgment 
Judge Jackson issued his findings of fact on November 5, 1999, holding that Microsoft's dominance of the x86-based personal computer operating systems market constituted a monopoly, and that Microsoft had taken actions to crush threats to that monopoly, including applications from Apple, Java, Netscape, Lotus Software, RealNetworks, Linux, and others. On April 3, 2000, Jackson issued his conclusions of law, holding that Microsoft had committed monopolization, attempted monopolization, and tying in violation of Sections 1 and 2 of the Sherman Antitrust Act. 

On June 7, 2000, the District Court ordered a breakup of Microsoft as its remedy. According to that judgment, Microsoft would have to be split into two separate units, one to produce the operating system and one to produce other software components. Microsoft immediately appealed the judgment to the D.C. Circuit Court of Appeals.

Appeals Court decision
After Microsoft filed its appeal, the U.S. government and the states in the suit requested a process that would skip the intermediate Circuit Court and send the case directly to the U.S. Supreme Court. Such an action is permitted by a section of the United States Code that gives the Supreme Court jurisdiction to hear direct appeals from the District Court level in certain antitrust cases initiated by the federal government, if "the district judge who adjudicated the case enters an order stating that immediate consideration of the appeal by the Supreme Court is of general public importance in the administration of justice." The states also filed a petition for certiorari before judgment at the Supreme Court, requesting the same direct appeal process without going through the Circuit Court. The Supreme Court rejected these requests and sent the appeal to the D.C. Circuit Court.

On June 28, 2001, the Circuit Court overturned Judge Jackson's rulings against Microsoft. This was partly because Jackson had improperly discussed the case with the news media while it was still in progress, violating the Code of Conduct for American judges. The Circuit Court judges accused Jackson of unethical conduct and determined that he should have recused himself from the case. Thus the Circuit Court adopted a "drastically altered scope of liability" due to Jackson's conduct, which was favorable for Microsoft. 

Jackson's response was that Microsoft's conduct itself was the cause of any "perceived bias"; Microsoft executives had, according to him, "proved, time and time again, to be inaccurate, misleading, evasive, and transparently false. ... Microsoft is a company with an institutional disdain for both the truth and for rules of law that lesser entities must respect. It is also a company whose senior management is not averse to offering specious testimony to support spurious defenses to claims of its wrongdoing." 

Ultimately, the Circuit Court overturned Jackson's holding that Microsoft should be broken up as an illegal monopoly. However, the Circuit Court did not overturn Jackson's findings of fact, and held that traditional antitrust analysis was not equipped to consider software-related practices like browser tie-ins. The case was remanded back to the D.C. District Court for further proceedings on this matter, with Judge Colleen Kollar-Kotelly presiding.

Settlement
The Department of Justice announced on September 6, 2001, that it was no longer seeking to break up Microsoft and would instead seek a lesser antitrust penalty. Microsoft decided to draft a settlement proposal allowing PC manufacturers to adopt non-Microsoft software.

On November 2, 2001, the DOJ reached an agreement with Microsoft to settle the case. The proposed settlement required Microsoft to share its application programming interfaces with third-party companies and appoint a panel of three people who would have full access to Microsoft's systems, records, and source code for five years in order to ensure compliance. However, the DOJ did not require Microsoft to change any of its code nor did it prevent Microsoft from tying other software with Windows in the future. On August 5, 2002, Microsoft announced that it would make some concessions towards the proposed final settlement ahead of the judge's decision. On November 1, 2002, Judge Kollar-Kotelly released a ruling that accepted most of the proposed DOJ settlement. Nine states and the District of Columbia (which had been pursuing the case together with the DOJ) did not agree with the settlement, arguing that it did not go far enough to curb Microsoft's anti-competitive business practices. On June 30, 2004, the D.C. Circuit Court approved the settlement with the Justice Department, rejecting the states' claims that the sanctions were inadequate.

In its 2008 Annual Report, Microsoft stated:

Microsoft's obligations under the settlement, as originally drafted, expired on November 12, 2007. However, Microsoft later "agreed to consent to a two-year extension of part of the Final Judgments" dealing with communications protocol licensing, and stated that if the government later wished to extend those aspects of the settlement as far as 2012, it would not object. The government made clear that the extension was intended to serve only to give the relevant part of the settlement "the opportunity to succeed for the period of time it was intended to cover", rather than being due to any "pattern of willful and systematic violations".

Impact and criticism
After the 2002 settlement, industry pundit Robert X. Cringely believed a breakup was not possible, and that "now the only way Microsoft can die is by suicide." Andrew Chin, an antitrust law professor at the University of North Carolina at Chapel Hill who assisted Judge Jackson in drafting the findings of fact at the initial District Court trial, wrote that the settlement gave Microsoft "a special antitrust immunity to license Windows and other 'platform software' under contractual terms that destroy freedom of competition." Law professor Eben Moglen noted that the way Microsoft was required to disclose its APIs and protocols was useful only for “interoperating with a Windows Operating System Product”, not for implementing support of those APIs and protocols in any competing operating system.

Economist Milton Friedman believed that the antitrust case against Microsoft set a dangerous precedent that foreshadowed increasing government regulation of an industry that had been relatively free of government intrusion, and that future technological progress in the industry will be impeded as a result. The magazine Business & Economic Research argued that, contrary to Friedman's concerns, the settlement actually had little effect on Microsoft's behavior. The fines, restrictions, and monitoring imposed were not enough to prevent it from "abusing its monopolistic power and too little to prevent it from dominating the software and operating system industry." For that reason, Microsoft remained dominant and monopolistic after the trial, and it continued to stifle competitors and innovative technology.

Chris Butts, writing in the Northwestern Journal of Technology and Intellectual Property, argued that the U.S. government recognized the benefits of including a web browser with an operating system. At the appellate level, the government dropped the claim of tying given that—as laid out in Section 1 of the Sherman Act—it would have had to prove that more harm than good resulted from the type of tying carried out by Microsoft.

See also

Antitrust, a 2001 film about "NURV", a large software company that presents a fictionalized Microsoft
Browser wars
Criticism of Microsoft
Microsoft litigation
Microshaft Winblows 98, a 1998 video game parodying the Windows 98 interface that featured numerous allusions to United States v. Microsoft Corp.
Removal of Internet Explorer
US antitrust law

References

Further reading

Articles
 Andrew Chin, Decoding Microsoft: A First Principles Approach, 40 Wake Forest Law Review 1 (2005)
 Kenneth Elzinga, David Evans, and Albert Nichols, United States v. Microsoft: Remedy or Malady? 9 Geo. Mason L. Rev. 633 (2001)
 John Lopatka and William Page, Antitrust on Internet Time: Microsoft and the Law and Economics of Exclusion, 7 Supreme Court Economic Review 157–231 (1999)
 John Lopatka and William Page, The Dubious Search For Integration in the Microsoft Trial, 31 Conn. L. Rev. 1251 (1999)
 John Lopatka and William Page, Who Suffered Antitrust Injury in the Microsoft Case?, 69 George Washington Law Review 829-59 (2001)
 Alan Meese, Monopoly Bundling In Cyberspace: How Many Products Does Microsoft Sell ? 44 Antitrust Bulletin 65 (1999)
 Alan Meese, Don't Disintegrate Microsoft (Yet), 9 Geo. Mason L. Rev. 761 (2001)
 Steven Salop and R. Craig Romaine, Preserving Monopoly: Economic Analysis, Legal Standards, and the Microsoft Case, 7 Geo. Mas. L. Rev. 617 (1999)
 Howard A. Shelanski and J. Gregory Sidak, Antitrust Divestiture in Network Industries, 68 University of Chicago Law Review 1 (2001)

Books

External links
 Final Judgment in U.S. v. Microsoft (injunction including final settlement terms approved by the court) (note that the copy posted on the district court's web site is actually an earlier version that the court declined to approve).
 The United States DOJ's website on U.S. v. Microsoft
 Microsoft's Antitrust Case, Microsoft News Center
 Wired news timeline of the Microsoft antitrust case
 ZDnet story on 4th anniversary of Microsoft antitrust case
 ZDnet story on proposed concessions
 Antitrust & the Internet: Microsoft case archive
 "A Case of Insecure Browsing" by Andrew Chin. Raleigh News & Observer, September 30, 2004
 Bill Gates deposition video at Microsoft on August 27, 1998 (Windows Media, Ogg Theora and Ogg Vorbis formats)
 The Center for the Advancement of Capitalism
 Nader 0, Microsoft 0 at Upside Magazine of December 31, 1997
 An Interview with Marc Andreessen about Microsoft antitrust litigation and browser wars 

United States Court of Appeals for the District of Columbia Circuit cases
United States computer case law
Microsoft criticisms and controversies
United States antitrust case law
Microsoft litigation
2001 in United States case law